The Inter-American Dialogue (Spanish: Diálogo Interamericano), also known as the Dialogue or IAD,  is a U.S.-based think tank in the field of international affairs primarily related to the Western Hemisphere. Headquartered in Washington, D.C it intends to "foster democratic governance, prosperity, and social equity in Latin America and the Caribbean". The Dialogue's research areas focus on the rule of law, education, migration, remittances, energy, climate change and extractive industries.

History
The Dialogue originated from the efforts of Abraham F. Lowenthal, who in the late 1970s and early 1980s was the secretary of the Latin America program at the Woodrow Wilson International Center for Scholars. Together with Peter D. Bell, who at that time was engaged in The Latin America program at the Ford Foundation, he approached Sol M. Linowitz, former US Ambassador to the Organization of American States, with an idea to assemble citizens from throughout the hemisphere to set a new regional agenda. Linowitz proposed creation of an "inter-American dialogue". He broached the idea to Galo Plaza, the former president of Ecuador and former secretary general of the Organization of American States.

The Dialogue's first meeting of members took place in 1982 under the auspices of the Aspen Institute. At first the Dialogue did not engage in extensive original research, having only one or two professional full-time staffers. Eventually, Lowenthal raised enough funds to convert the Dialogue into a full-scale think tank with a full-time research staff. This, along with the changes in the world politics, put the Dialogue in the advantageous position to shape Latin America policy of the Clinton administration. By 1993, the Dialogue expanded and diversified its activities to include conferences, working groups, congressional seminars, forums for visiting Latin Americans, and individually authored articles.

In 1993, the Dialogue conducted a research into the role "external actors could play in consolidating, deepening and defending democracy in Western Hemisphere". The timing was deemed appropriate considering "the move of the Eastern Europe and Latin America to democratic government". Advocating "market-based solutions to the reduction of poverty" as the force driving the democratic wave, the Dialogue was eager to foster in Latin America "an economic model fueled by the individual desire to consume and employing market-set prices to coordinate with relative efficiency the supply and demand for goods, services, and capital".

In 2005, the Dialogue released a report on Latin America entitled "A Break in the Clouds", exposing "the many daunting challenges still confronting the region". In 2009, the Dialogue released "A Second Chance: US Policy in the Americas", the report prepared for U.S. policy makers in the wake of the 2008 global financial-economic crisis. The report openly conceded that "popular frustration may lead to diminished support for democracy and markets" throughout both North and Latin America, yet recommended for the United States to quickly "gain congressional ratification of the already negotiated and signed free trade agreements with Colombia and Panama" while preserving "hemisphere-wide free trade" as a "critical long-term goal".

In 2010, Michael Shifter, the former president of the Dialogue, and Jorge Dominguez, Professor and Vice Provost for International Affairs at Harvard University, organized a meeting with the representatives of the Washington political community about democratic institutions and practices in Latin America. In particular, the sessions discussed constitutional reforms made by Latin American presidents, the growing influence of the Executive branch over the Judicial branch in many Latin American countries, corruption in governmental institutions and the challenges that it presents to democracy, advances in terms of social inclusion, the effects of the growing restrictions on the communications media and on opposition parties in some Latin American countries, and organized crime and drug trafficking and the threats that they present to democratic institutions.

By 2015 the Dialogue had become increasingly worried about the Chinese activities in the Latin America. Its analysis showed that China held $65 billion of Venezuelan debt, and that in 2016, 92% of China's loans directed to Latin America went to Ecuador, Venezuela and Brazil. In a 2015 interview Margaret Myers, director of the China and Latin America program at the Dialogue, called the Chinese diplomacy and also Chinese foreign policy "slightly more aggressive" than earlier. She said that "partnerships in the region between China and certain countries that would in some form have been thought to provoke the U.S. in the past [are] no longer seemingly a major consideration".

Programs 
The Inter-American Dialogue has five programs that convene events and host initiatives with policy makers, business leaders, journalists, advocates and analysts. The programs also produce analysis and reports about their respective issues in the Western hemisphere.

Education Program 
The Education Program researches and advocates to improve the quality of education across Latin America. It focuses on five key initiatives: early childhood development, teacher quality, technology and innovation in education, English language learning, and skills development.

The program hosts various conferences and forums, including a conference with the government of Colombia on drafting a “Regional Agenda on Early Childhood Development” in 2017 and the Working Group on Technology and Innovation in Education, which began meeting in 2019. The program also regularly issues reports and analysis across its initiatives, including a report co-published with the Organization of American States called “Strategies to Reduce Educational Inequality in 2019” and a report co-published with CAF – Development Bank of Latin America on technical education and professional development.

Migration, Remittances, and Development Program 
The Migration, Remittances, and Development Program uses research, policy analysis, project implementation, and technical assistance of migration and transnational economic issues to understand current trends and leverage migration for development.

The program runs the Remittance Industry Observatory, a membership-based initiative to provide knowledge about the remittance market. Furthermore, the program performs analysis and field research, and has published reports like “Recent Trends in Central American Migration” and a yearly report on Remittances to Latin America. In Guatemala the program has been implementing a project with the support of the U.S. Agency for International Development (USAID) to combine financial education, access to credit, diaspora support, and after-school programs to promote development in communities of high emigration.

Asia & Latin America Program 
The Asia & Latin America program examines Asian, especially Chinese, firms’ and governments’ linkages with Latin America. It analyzes, reports, and promotes “responsible and growth-promoting relationships” between the two regions.

The program's China-Latin America Finance Database tracks billions of dollars in Chinese financing in Latin America, and the program hosts conferences around the world, including in Mexico, China, and Japan. The program also runs a China-Latin America Young Scholars Program that hosts high-level meetings and promotes collaborative research.

Peter D. Bell Rule of Law Program 
The Peter D. Bell Rule of Law Program promotes the rule of law by convening forums and policy debates and providing comprehensive analysis and reports to strengthen governance, inclusive economic growth, and democracy in Latin America.

The program organizes the Venezuela Working Group, which is chaired by former Costa Rican President Laura Chinchilla and US Ambassador Donna Hrinak, to promote policy responses with public reports and private diplomacy. Additionally, it hosts an anti-corruption symposia series with the Inter-American Development Bank and an annual conference with Fundamedios on media and democracy in the Americas. The program also publishes reports and analysis, including on private security companies and citizen security in the region.

The namesake of the program, Peter D. Bell, was a founder of the Inter-American Dialogue and the president of CARE USA.

Energy, Climate, & Extractive Industries Program 
The Energy, Climate, & Extractive Industries Program provides analysis and convenes policy makers, corporate leaders, and experts to frame policy debates on investment and sustainable development of natural resources.

The program hosts an energy and resources committee of corporations and regional organizations to discuss key issues in the energy sphere. Moreover, the program runs the Latin America Clean Transport Initiative to raise awareness about electric vehicles, provide collaboration opportunities between governments, corporations, and civil society, and develop lessons to share throughout Latin America to accelerate the adoption of electric vehicles. Analysis and reports on issues like deforestation in the Amazon rainforest, environmental regulation, and liquid natural gas in the Americas are also produced by the program.

Major initiatives
CAF Conference:
Established in 1996 as a joint initiative of CAF – Development Bank of Latin America, the Inter-American Dialogue, and the Organization of American States, the CAF Conference brings together more than 1,000 world leaders to debate and discuss the most pressing developments facing the Americas. Since then, the conference has grown to become the primary forum for policy makers and analysts, journalists, governments and international organizations, entrepreneurs and investors, and civil society representatives to review progress in the Western Hemisphere and address pending challenges.

Awards Gala:
The Inter-American Dialogue's Leadership for the Americas Awards Gala celebrates individuals and organizations committed to advancing democratic governance, social equity and prosperity in the Western Hemisphere. The annual event brings together top world leaders whose exceptional contributions have been instrumental in addressing the pressing challenges of our hemisphere. More than 400 guests attend the gala, comprising an elite audience from the highest levels of government, business, media and civil society.
 
Sol M. Linowitz Forum
The Sol M. Linowitz Forum, established in 1996, is dedicated to improving the quality of debate and communication on Western Hemispheric issues. The forum pays tribute to Ambassador Linowitz, the Dialogue's founding chairman, and assembles Dialogue members once every two years to address the most important issues affecting the Americas. At the forum, Dialogue members meet in plenary sessions and in smaller workshops, probe their differences, identify cooperative solutions to regional problems, and develop consensus proposals for action. Drawing on these discussions, the Dialogue produces a policy report that reviews the main issues and offers recommendations for policy and action–for governments, international organizations, and private groups. The report is published and widely circulated throughout the hemisphere.

Publications 
The Dialogue publishes a daily news service, the Latin American Advisor, that reports on major events and trends in the region. Two additional newsletters, the Latin American Energy Advisor and the Latin American Financial Services Advisor, are published weekly and biweekly respectively.

Along with reports published by each of the programs throughout the year, the Dialogue published editions of the book Unfulfilled Promises: Latin America Today in 2019 in English, Spanish, and Portuguese.

Funding
The Dialogue's funding comes from a diverse group of corporations, governments, foundations and multilateral organizations. In 2018, grants and contributions represented 35% of the Dialogue's revenue, government grants accounted for 26% and the corporate program provided an additional 15% of the think-tank's funding.

Major donors span the globe, from foundations in El Salvador, Ford Foundation, Henry Luce Foundation, Vidanta Foundation and the Van Leer Foundation. Several governments, such as Switzerland, South Korea, and the United States, provide funding through their foreign affairs ministries. Major private sector donors from around the world, including the BMW Corporation, Pearson, and Ladrillera Santafé financially support the Dialogue, as do many individual donors from the United States and Latin America. The Dialogue's mission is also supported by multilateral organizations that work in the region, like the CAF-Development Bank of Latin America, the Inter-American Development Bank, and the Organization of American States.

Members
The Dialogue has 124 members from Latin America, the United States, Canada, the Caribbean, and Spain. 20 of its members served as presidents of their countries, three dozen served at the cabinet level, 17 served in national legislatures, 25 are leaders in business or finance sectors, and seven are associated with the media.

Board of directors
Inter-American Dialogue is currently chaired by former President of Costa Rica Laura Chinchilla and former U.S. Department of State Thomas A. Shannon Jr. Its vice-chairs are Mack McLarty, former White House Chief of Staff, and L. Enrique Garcia, president of CAF – Development Bank of Latin America.

Other members of the Board of Directors:
 Fernando Henrique Cardoso (Brazil)
 David de Ferranti (US)
 Carla Anderson Hills (US)
 Donna J. Hrinak (US)
 Enrique V. Iglesias (Uruguay)
 Earl Jarrett (Jamaica)
 Ricardo Lagos (Chile)
 Susana Malcorra (Argentina)
 Maria Fernanda Teixeira (Brazil) 
 Roberto Teixeira da Costa (Brazil)
 Arturo Sarukhán (Mexico)
 Maria Priscila Vansetti (Brazil)
 Ernesto Zedillo (Mexico)

References

External links
 

Foreign policy and strategy think tanks in the United States
501(c)(3) organizations
Organizations established in 1982
Think tanks established in 1982
Think tanks based in Washington, D.C.
Non-profit organizations based in Washington, D.C.